The 1921 Alberta general election was held on July 18, 1921, to elect members to the 5th Alberta Legislative Assembly. It was one of only five times that Alberta has changed governments.

The Liberal Party, which had governed the province since its creation in 1905, led by Charles Stewart at the time of the election, was defeated by a very-new United Farmers of Alberta political party. The UFA was an agricultural lobby organization that was contesting its first general election. It had previously elected one MLA in a by-election.

Under the Block Voting system, each voter in Edmonton and Calgary could vote for up to five candidates, while Medicine Hat voters could vote for up to two candidates. All other districts remained one voter – one vote.

No party ran a full slate of candidates province-wide. The UFA ran candidates in most of the rural constituencies, and one in Edmonton. The Liberal Party ran candidates in almost all the constituencies. The Conservatives ran a bare dozen candidates, mostly in the cities. Labour mostly avoided running against UFA candidates, by running candidates in the cities and in Rocky Mountain, where it counted on coal miners' votes.

The United Farmers took most of the rural seats, doing particularly well in the heavily Protestant south of the province. A majority of the votes in the constituencies where the UFA ran candidates went to the UFA.

Labour took five seats, two in Calgary. One Labour MLA was named to the UFA government cabinet, in a sort of coalition government. 

The Liberals took all the seats in Edmonton, due to the block-voting system in use. This multiple-vote system also skewed the vote count.

The campaign

Liberals
The Liberal Party, which had governed the province since 1905, were led into the election by its third Premier and leader, Charles Stewart.

AGT scandal
The Alberta Government Telephones scandal broke before the election. It was learned that the Liberals spent AGT money to have telephone poles crated and shipped in big stacks to remote communities in which they had no intention of installing phone lines in an effort to garner support and votes.

United Farmers

The United Farmers of Alberta under the leadership of President Henry Wise Wood was contesting its first general election. The UFA's political wing, as a party, had come into being after the organization had decided to no longer be content with being a lobby group. They merged with the Non-Partisan League of Alberta, which had formed before the 1917 general election and had elected a couple members. The Non-Partisan League activists were significant within the political machinery of the United Farmers.

The merged party experienced a significant amount of growth in the run up to the general election. It won its first victory with the election of candidate Alexander Moore in the electoral district of Cochrane in 1919 and achieved a coup when Conservative leader George Hoadley crossed the floor. The two Non-Partisan League MLAs, despite not changing their affiliation, caucused with the United Farmers.

Wise Wood knew midway through the election campaign that his party was going to form government. In a famous speech he gave in Medicine Hat on July 8, 1921, he was quoted as saying "Farmers may not be ready to take over government, but they are going to do it anyway". He also said in that speech that he would have preferred that only his 20 best candidates were elected, to form the opposition, but he said he expected there would be a lot more than that elected.

Split in the Labour forces
The campaign was contested by two provincial labour parties: a main party named the Dominion Labor and a splinter group in Edmonton named the Independent Labor Party.

Dominion Labor ran candidates in primarily urban ridings such as Calgary, Edmonton, Lethbridge and Medicine Hat. Its President Holmes Jowatt declining to seek office himself, instead devoting his energies help other candidates.

At the beginning of the election Independent Labor offered to nominate Edmonton area candidates at a joint convention with the DLP, to prevent the splitting of the labour vote and use the co-operative good-will to eventually unite the parties. The Dominion Labor declined the offer stating that to do so would divide its own ticket.

Among the ILP candidates was pioneer photographer Ernest Brown, soon after to lead meetings of the Communist Party.

Conservatives
The Conservative Party which has been the primary opposition in the province since it was created in 1905 had seen a split in the ranks under the leadership of George Hoadley. The caucus divided into two separate Conservative caucuses. Hoadley left the Conservative party sitting as an Independent and then won the United Farmers nomination in Okotoks and crossed the floor. The party replaced Hoadley by selecting Albert Ewing an Edmonton area Member of the Legislative Assembly as leader.

The Conservatives spent the campaign criticizing the wasteful and extravagant spending of the Liberal government. They also reminded Alberta voters of the Alberta Government Telephones, telephone pole scandal. The Conservatives campaign for reforms to the provincial tax code as well as pressing for provincial resource rights and voter list reforms in the election act.

Despite the split in the party the Conservative campaign attracted some high-profile support. Former Liberal Premier Alexander Rutherford a big supporter of Ewing, led the campaign for the five Conservative candidates contesting for seats in Edmonton.

The Conservative party was a long time recovering from the split in the party. Supporters of Hoadley and their rural base migrated to the United Farmers. The change of amalgamating the districts in Calgary and Edmonton to a block vote did not help Conservative candidates. In Edmonton the strong Liberal block dominated and all five seats were captured by Liberal candidates. The only Conservative to return was Lethbridge MLA John Stewart. Albert Ewing went down to defeat in Edmonton.

Socialist
The Socialist Party of Alberta had been in decline since O'Brien lost his seat in the 1913 general election. Two Socialist candidates ran in this election, under the banner Labour Socialist, Frank Williams in Calgary and Marie Mellard in Edmonton. Marie Mellard would join the new Communist Party within the year.

Calgary, Edmonton and Medicine Hat voters cast multiple votes 
The Liberals, in fact, won a larger share of the votes cast than the UFA (about 34%, compared to 29% for the UFA).

The popular vote numbers  exaggerate the actual number of Liberal party supporters however. Urban voters in Calgary and Edmonton were allowed to place five votes and Medicine Hat voters 2 votes, as Edmonton and Calgary contained 5 seats each and Medicine Hat 2 seats, while voters in the other constituencies, most of which were contested by the UFA, only had 1 vote each under the first past the post electoral system. The United Farmers did not run in Calgary and only had a single candidate in Edmonton, thus it did not benefit from the higher weighted city vote.

This over-representation of big-city voters was so significant that there were more than 120,000 more votes counted than there were voters voting—significant as no single party received more than 102,000 votes. The Liberal Party received 28,000 votes in Edmonton and 20,000 votes in Calgary, almost half of their total across the province, under this system where each big-city Liberal voter could lodge five votes for the party. If you give the Liberal Party only one-fifth of their vote tally in Edmonton and Calgary, the Liberal Party total vote count decreases to well below the UFA total. Now it could be that each voter in Edmonton gave one of his/her votes to the Liberals (but not likely), but even so the Liberal candidates in Edmonton received 8,000 more votes in Edmonton than there were voters who voted. This 8,000 is more than half the difference between the Liberal's and the UFA's tallies province-wide. 

As well, in Calgary 17,000 voters cast about 76,000 votes. As none of these went to UFA candidates (none ran in Calgary) this massive multiple voting going elsewhere gave the UFA a lower proportion overall.

It was also noted by defenders of the government that the UFA percentage of total seats (62 percent) is identical to the percentage of votes it received in the constituencies in which it did run candidates.

Aftermath
The result of the election radically and forever altered the political landscape of the province. The United Farmers won a majority government, mostly with rural MLAs predominantly from the south of the province, while the Liberals, formerly in power, were moved to the opposition side of the Chamber with MLAs in the cities of Calgary and Edmonton and some northern strongholds. The Liberals have never won power again; the closest they have come since then was winning 39 seats and opposition status in 1993. As well starting in 1921 and lasting until 1971, the Alberta provincial government was not the same as either of the two largest parties in the House of Commons.

The 38 MLAs who attended the first United Farmers caucus meeting voted unanimously for UFA President Henry Wise Wood to lead the government as Premier. Wood, who had opposed the UFA becoming a political party for fear that political in-fighting would break up the movement, declined becoming Premier because he was more interested in operating the machinery of the United Farmers movement rather than crafting government policy. He said he feared that the UFA would repeat what had happened elsewhere when farmers movements engaged in electoral politics, rose to power and quickly destroyed themselves. He wanted to remain focused on the farmers movement as a non-partisan movement and as an economic group instead of as a political party. The UFA vice-president, Percival Baker, had won his riding with a majority of votes, despite being badly injured in a tree-falling accident and was speculated to have a place in the cabinet. He however died the day after the election. The United Farmers caucus finally chose Herbert Greenfield, who had not run in the election, to become Premier.

Results

Members elected

|-
|Acadia
|
|James C. Cottrell90622.58%
||
|Lorne Proudfoot3,10677.42%
|
|
|
|
|
|
||
|John A. McColl
|-
|Alexandra
|
|Theodore H. Currie28211.38%
||
|Peter J. Enzenauer2,19588.62%
|
|
|
|
|
|
||
|James R. Lowery
|-
|Athabasca
||
|George Mills1,04370.43%
|
|
|
|John Angelo43829.57%
|
|
|
|
||
|Alexander Grant MacKay
|-
|Beaver River
||
|Joseph M. Dechene1,56062.33%
|
|H. Montambault94337.67%
|
|
|
|
|
|
||
|Wilfrid Gariepy
|-
|Bow Valley
||
|Charles Richmond Mitchell1,69472.30%
|
|George A. Love64927.70%
|
|
|
|
|
|
||
|Charles Richmond Mitchell
|-
|Camrose
|
|George P. Smith2,39144.03%
||
|Vernor W. Smith3,04055.97%
|
|
|
|
|
|
||
|George P. Smith
|-
|Cardston
|
|Martin Woolf61531.46%
||
|George Lewis Stringam1,34068.54%
|
|
|
|
|
|
||
|Martin Woolf
|-
|Claresholm
|
|
|
|Louise McKinney76348.54%
|
|
|
|
||
|Thomas Charles Milnes (Ind.)80951.46%
||
|Louise McKinney
|-
|rowspan="2"|Clearwater
||
|Joseph E. State23441.94%
|
|
|
|
|
|
|
|Robert G. Campbell11720.97%
|rowspan="2" |
|rowspan="2"|Joseph E. State
|-
|
|O.T. Lee14726.34%
|
|
|
|
|
|
|
|S.W. Chambers6010.75%
|-
|Cochrane
|
|A.S. McDonald54136.02%
||
|Alexander Moore96163.98%
|
|
|
|
|
|
||
|Alexander Moore
|-
|Coronation
|
|Arthur M. Day96020.44%
||
|George Norman Johnston3,73679.56%
|
|
|
|
|
|
||
|William Wallace Wilson
|-
|Didsbury
|
|George H. Webber1,73440.69%
||
|Austin Bingley Claypool2,52859.31%
|
|
|
|
|
|
||
|Henry B. Atkins
|-
|Edson
||
|Charles Wilson Cross1,32157.94%
|
|
|
|John Diamond95942.06%
|
|
|
|
||
|Charles Wilson Cross
|-
|Gleichen
|
|Harry Scott1,06540.49%
||
|John C. Buckley1,56559.51%
|
|
|
|
|
|
||
|Fred Davis
|-
|Grouard
||
|Jean Léon Côté96357.84%
|
|Henry George Dimsdale70242.16%
|
|
|
|
|
|
||
|Jean Léon Côté
|-
|Hand Hills
|
|Robert Berry Eaton1,58327.13%
||
|Gordon A. Forster4,25272.87%
|
|
|
|
|
|
||
|Robert Berry Eaton
|-
|High River
|
|J.V. Drumheller86746.09%
||
|Samuel Brown1,01453.91%
|
|
|
|
|
|
||
|George Douglas Stanley
|-
|Innisfail
|
|Daniel J. Morkeberg74130.85%
||
|Donald Cameron1,66169.15%
|
|
|
|
|
|
||
|Daniel J. Morkeberg
|-
|Lac Ste. Anne
|
|C.J. Stiles83732.98%
||
|Charles Milton McKeen1,57462.02%
|
|
|
|
|
|J.H. Mackay (Ind.)1275.00%
||
|George R. Barker
|-
|Lacombe
|
|William Franklin Puffer1,53942.14%
||
|Mary Irene Parlby2,11357.86%
|
|
|
|
|
|
||
|Andrew Gilmour
|-
|Leduc
||
|Stanley G. Tobin1,35150.19%
|
|D.S. Muir1,34149.81%
|
|
|
|
|
|
||
|Stanley G. Tobin
|-
|Lethbridge
|
|
|
|
|
|
|
|John Marsh1,37437.89%
||
|John S. Stewart (Ind.)2,25262.11%
|
|
|-
|Little Bow
|
|James McNaughton85635.52%
||
|Oran Leo McPherson1,55464.48%
|
|
|
|
|
|
||
|James McNaughton
|-
|Macleod
|
|George Skelding62046.03%
||
|William H. Shield72753.97%
|
|
|
|
|
|
||
|George Skelding
|-
|Medicine Hat
|
|Oliver Boyd2,27818.9%H. H. Foster2,01316.7%	
||
|Perren E. Baker4,16534.5%
|
|
||
|William G. Johnston3,60229.9%
|
|
||
|Nelson C. Spencer
|-
|Nanton
|
|John M. Glendenning45838.65%
||
|Daniel Harcourt Galbraith72761.35%
|
|
|
|
|
|
||
|James Weir
|-
|Okotoks
|
|Ernest Austin Daggett39025.67%
||
|George Hoadley1,12974.33%
|
|
|
|
|
|
||
|George Hoadley
|-
|Olds
|
|Duncan Marshall1,23839.50%
||
|Nelson S. Smith1,89660.50%
|
|
|
|
|
|
||
|Duncan Marshall
|-
|Peace River
|
|
||
|Donald MacBeth Kennedy3,29162.69%
|
|
|
|
|
|
||
|William A. Rae
|-
|Pembina
|
|J.H. Phillips54021.40%
||
|George MacLachlan1,83872.85%
|
|
|
|
|
|F.D. Armitage (Ind.)1455.75%
||
|Gordon MacDonald
|-
|Pincher Creek
|
|Harvey Bossenberry47134.43%
||
|Earle G. Cook57241.81%
|
|
|
|
|
|A.E. Cox19214.01%Donald Randolph McIvor1339.72%
||
|John H.W.S. Kemmis
|-
|Ponoka
|
|William A. Campbell81536.94%
||
|P. Baker1,39163.06%
|
|
|
|
|
|
||
|Charles Orin Cunningham
|-
|Red Deer
|
|John J. Gaetz1,14634.66%
||
|George Wilbert Smith2,16065.34%
|
|
|
|
|
|
||
|Edward Michener
|-
|Redcliff
|
|Charles S. Pingle1,38741.56%
||
|William C. Smith1,95058.44%
|
|
|
|
|
|
||
|Charles S. Pingle
|-
|Ribstone
|
|James Gray Turgeon90929.31%
||
|Charles O.F. Wright2,19270.69%
|
|
|
|
|
|
||
|James Gray Turgeon
|-
|Rocky Mountain
|
|Alexander M. Morrison1,14335.08%
|
|Wallace James Sharpe81124.89%
|
|
||
|Philip Martin Christophers1,30440.02%
|
|
||
|Robert E. Campbell
|-
|Sedgewick
||
|Charles StewartAcclaimed
|
|
|
|
|
|
|
|
||
|Charles Stewart
|-
|St. Albert
|
|Lucien Boudreau1,00044.76%
||
|Telesphore St. Arnaud1,23455.24%
|
|
|
|
|
|
||
|Lucien Boudreau
|-
|St. Paul
|
|Prosper-Edmond Lessard98441.66%
||
|Laudas Joly1,37858.34%
|
|
|
|
|
|
||
|Prosper-Edmond Lessard
|-
|Stettler
|
|Edward H. Prudden1,60834.11%
||
|Albert L. Sanders3,10665.89%
|
|
|
|
|
|
||
|Edward H. Prudden
|-
|Stony Plain
|
|Jacob Miller64732.33%
||
|Willard M. Washburn1,00150.02%
|
|Frederick W. Lundy30615.29%
|
|
|
|Dan Brox (Ind.)472.35%
||
|Frederick W. Lundy
|-
|Sturgeon
|
|John Robert Boyle7,310153.44%
||
|Samuel Allen Carson2,81559.09%
|
|
|
|
|
|
||
|John Robert Boyle
|-
|Taber
|
|Archibald J. McLean1,99146.30%
||
|Lawrence Peterson2,30953.70%
|
|
|
|
|
|
||
|Archibald J. McLean
|-
|Vegreville
|
|Joseph S. McCallum1,32530.31%
||
|Archibald Malcolm Matheson3,04769.69%
|
|
|
|
|
|
||
|Joseph S. McCallum
|-
|Vermilion
|
|Arthur W. Ebbett93924.11%
||
|Richard Gavin Reid2,95575.89%
|
|
|
|
|
|
||
|Arthur W. Ebbett
|-
|Victoria
|
|Francis A. Walker1,28847.90%
||
|Wasyl Fedun1,40152.10%
|
|
|
|
|
|
||
|Francis A. Walker
|-
|Wainwright
|
|Harcus Strachan91328.10%
||
|John Russell Love1,87757.77%
|
|George LeRoy Hudson45914.13%
|
|
|
|
||
|George LeRoy Hudson
|-
|Warner
|
|Frank S. Leffingwell49039.36%
||
|Maurice Joy Conner75560.64%
|
|
|
|
|
|
||
|Frank S. Leffingwell
|-
|Wetaskiwin
|
|Hugh John Montgomery1,21644.64%
||
|Evert E. Sparks1,50855.36%
|
|
|
|
|
|
||
|Hugh John Montgomery
|-
|Whitford
||
|Andrew S. ShandroAcclaimed
|
|
|
|
|
|
|
|
||
|Andrew S. Shandro
|-
|}

10 by-elections were held in the months after the election. Some were held to sit several UFA MLAs and one Labour MLA in the new cabinet. 
Herbert Greenfield after being chosen to serve as premier ran for a seat in a by-election. 
John Brownlee after being chosen to serve as a cabinet minister ran for a seat in a by-election.
Another was held after a Liberal MLA (Andrew Shandro) was thrown down for taking a seat under suspicious circumstances.
All were successful for the UFA (and one Labour).

Calgary

Edmonton

Notes

References

Further reading

External links
Elections Alberta

Alberta general
1921
General election
Alberta general election